NK Metalac is a Croatian football club based in the town of Osijek.

Association football clubs established in 1948
Football clubs in Croatia
Football clubs in Osijek-Baranja County
Sport in Osijek
1948 establishments in Croatia